Morlon David Wiley (born September 24, 1966) is an American former professional basketball player and former assistant coach for the National Basketball Association's Orlando Magic.

College career
Born in New Orleans, Louisiana, Wiley played college basketball at Long Beach State, where he was a four-year starter for the 49ers. In 1988, he was an all-Big West Conference pick, and his leadership led to the school's first NIT appearance. In his college career, he scored 30 points on six occasions, is third on the all-time list in assists with 425, second in steals with 187, and fourth in free throw percentage with .780. He was inducted into the 49ers' Hall of Fame in 2005.

Professional career
Wiley was drafted in the second round, 46th overall, by the Dallas Mavericks in the 1988 NBA Draft. He played a season for the Mavericks, playing in 51 games during the 1988-89 season. In the 1989 NBA Expansion Draft on June 15, Wiley became one of the 12 players chosen by the Orlando Magic to be placed on their first roster. On June 29, Wiley was signed to a two-year contract. In his first season with the Magic, he started a couple games, playing in 40, and averaged 5.7 points and 2.9 assists per game. The following season, he only played 34, and he was waived shortly into the 1991-92 season, having only played 9 games that season for Orlando. He signed onto the San Antonio Spurs, but only played 3 games for them. Wiley then became a member of the Atlanta Hawks for the rest of the season. After playing for parts of the 1991–92 and 1992-93 season, Wiley joined the Mavericks for the rest of the season, in his second stint. After not playing for most of the 1993-94 season, Wiley was signed to a 10-day contract by the Miami Heat on March 9, 1994. He then had a third sting with the Mavericks, playing for them for 12 games at the end of the season. After playing part of the 1994-95 season for the Mavericks in Wiley's third stint, he was traded to the Houston Rockets with a second-round pick for Scott Brooks, in the only trade deadline deal in 1995. Wiley never played for the Rockets, instead ending his career with a 10-day contract with the Hawks.

After his career ended, Wiley was part of the Dallas Mavericks' player development staff from 2000 to 2004. He then became an assistant coach for the Orlando Magic.

Personal
Wiley is the younger brother of fellow NBA alum Michael Wiley.

References

External links
NBA stats @ basketballreference.com

1966 births
Living people
African-American basketball players
American men's basketball players
Atlanta Hawks players
Basketball players from New Orleans
Dallas Mavericks draft picks
Dallas Mavericks players
Grand Rapids Hoops players
Long Beach State Beach men's basketball players
Miami Heat players
Orlando Magic expansion draft picks
Orlando Magic assistant coaches
Orlando Magic players
Point guards
Quad City Thunder players
Rapid City Thrillers players
San Antonio Spurs players
Shooting guards
21st-century African-American people
20th-century African-American sportspeople
Long Beach Polytechnic High School alumni